This bibliography includes major books and articles about British prime minister Margaret Thatcher and her policies in office.

Thatcher biographies

Politics

Economics and unions

Social policy

Foreign policy

Historiography

Primary sources

External links 
 

Conservatism-related lists
Bibliographies of people
Books by Margaret Thatcher
Political bibliographies
Books written by prime ministers of the United Kingdom